Lacus Gaudii (Latin gaudiī, "Lake of Joy") is a small lunar mare in the Terra Nivium region of the Moon. It is located at 16.3° N, 12.3° E and is 89 km in diameter.

References

External links
Lacus Gaudii at The Moon Wiki

Gaudii